Novofirsovo is a rural locality (a selo) in Kuryinsky District, Altai Krai, Russia. The population was 532 as of 2013. There are 11 streets.

Geography 
Novofirsovo is located 21 km north of Kurya (the district's administrative centre) by road. Krasnoznamenka and Nikolayevka are the nearest rural localities.

References 

Rural localities in Kuryinsky District